Brevicellicium is a genus of fungi in the family Hydnodontaceae. The genus has a collectively widespread distribution, and contains 13 species.

References

Trechisporales
Trechisporales genera